Mathias Bersang Sørensen (born 24 November 1991) is a Danish former professional footballer who played as a midfielder.

Career

Randers
After several seasons in Randers FC's academy, Bersang Sørensen first came to prominence with two substitutions in the Europa League. He made his debut on 1 July 2010 in a 6–1 win over F91 Dudelange, coming on in the 85th minute for Ricki Olsen. He was mostly used as a reserve during his time in Randers.

Hobro
On 22 December 2011, it was announced, that Bersang Sørensen had signed a two-and-a-half year contract with Danish 1st Division club Hobro IK.
Due to some great performances for the team, he signed a contract extension in October 2013 until 2016.

Skive
Bersang Sørensen transferred to Skive IK in the summer 2016, as his contract with Hobro had expired. He left the club in 2020, after suffering a concussion which ruled him out indefinitely.

References

External links

1991 births
Living people
Association football midfielders
Randers FC players
Hobro IK players
Skive IK players
Danish Superliga players
Danish 1st Division players
Danish 2nd Division players
Danish men's footballers
People from Randers
Sportspeople from the Central Denmark Region